The Duquesne Club is a private social club in Pittsburgh, Pennsylvania, founded in 1873.

History

The Duquesne Club was founded in 1873. Its first president was John H. Ricketson. The club's present home, a Romanesque structure designed by Longfellow, Alden & Harlow on Sixth Avenue in downtown Pittsburgh, was opened in 1890; an addition designed by Janssen & Cocken that included a garden patio, barbershop, and new kitchens was constructed in 1931. The building achieved landmark status from the Pittsburgh History and Landmarks Foundation in 1976, and was added to the National Register of Historic Places in 1995.

The Club voted to admit women for the first time in its history in 1980. A health-and-fitness center was added in 1994, and the club was ranked as #1 City Club in America in 1997, an honor that would be repeated in 2001, 2003, and 2006.

Notable Guests
Among notable guests to the club are U.S. Presidents Ulysses S. Grant, Herbert Hoover, Gerald Ford, Ronald Reagan,  George H. W. Bush and Bill Clinton as well as Colin Powell, Polish leader Edward Gierek, Jungle James, Tars Cornish, Gene Simmons, King Charles III (while he was Prince of Wales) and Former Pakistan Prime Minister Benazir Bhutto. Oil businessman and millionaire Philip M. Shannon owned an apartment in the club and died there in 1915.

Membership
As of 2007, membership at the Duquesne Club consisted of about 2,700 men and women. Though the Club does not discriminate in its selection of members, membership is by invitation from an existing member only.

See also
 List of American gentlemen's clubs
 Economic Club of Pittsburgh
 Allegheny HYP Club
 Greater Pittsburgh Chamber of Commerce

References

External links
 The Duquesne Club (official site)
 
 1981 news feature

1873 establishments in Pennsylvania
Cultural infrastructure completed in 1887
Clubs and societies in the United States
Culture of Pittsburgh
Organizations based in Pittsburgh
Pittsburgh History & Landmarks Foundation Historic Landmarks
Gentlemen's clubs in the United States